Tornado Outbreak is an action-adventure video game developed by Loose Cannon Studios and published by Konami Digital Entertainment for the PlayStation 3, Wii and Xbox 360. The game was announced at the Electronic Entertainment Expo in June 2009. The game was later re-released on the Xbox Live Marketplace on December 6, 2011.

Plot
Tornado Outbreak follows a group of Wind Warriors, that is led by Captain Nimbus. The Wind Warriors are a noble group of Air Elementals given the task of providing an atmosphere on lifeless planets. Players take control of a blue spiraling Wind Warrior named Zephyr, who has been selected by Nimbus to take over the reins of the squad of Wind Warriors. The Wind Warriors along with Zephyr and Nimbus uncover the anti-matter being known as Omegaton, whose six orbs of power were taken away from him by his enemies; flaming little creatures known as the Fire Flyers. In return for helping him regain his orbs of power, Omegaton provides the Wind Warriors with a Light Weight Object Amalgam Device (shorten as L.O.A.D. STARR) to protect them from the sun's deadly radiation.

Near the end of the game, it's revealed that Omegaton was from a backwards dimension; a hero in space is a villain on Earth. The game ends with Zephyr, Nimbus, and the Wind Warriors defeating Omegaton, and returning to their homeworld, Harmonia.

Gameplay

Tornado Outbreak's gameplay is in line with that of Katamari Damacy, in that (as Zephyr), players are required to suck ordinary Earth objects into their funnel to grow in size. An added level of complexity is present in Tornado Outbreak, in that players must stay in the shade at all times (shade is created by an object called the L.O.A.D. STARR), as Wind Warriors will die under direct sunlight. Each level is split into five stages. The first three stages are Zephyr pillaging the landscape in search of hiding Fire Flyers (with the location of Fire Flyers being designated by an orange glow under objects). After collecting fifty Fire Flyers in each of these three stages, a totem appears from underground, surrounding a large object on the outskirts of the playing field (a skyscraper, mountain, hotel complex, etc. depending on the geographical location – Vegas, Britain, a theme park, and so on). The fourth stage of each level is a race of sorts, which sees Zephyr flying through vortex rings surrounding the totems. This creates a massive storm above the landscape, complete with moving clouds and patches of sunlight. In the fifth stage, players must navigate these moving clouds to reach the Totems so that they can be destroyed in a button-mashing mini-game, thus revealing one of Omegaton's orbs and unlocking the next level.

Development 
Development of Tornado Outbreak started in July 2006. A PlayStation Portable port of the game was in consideration but was scrapped in favor of the PlayStation 3. The game was originally named Tornado Alley and focused around the premise of causing as much destruction within a given time limit.

Loose Cannon Studios 
Following the completion of Sly 3: Honor Among Thieves, Dev Madan and Matthew Scott left Sucker Punch Productions to form Loose Cannon Studios with Ricci Rukavina serving as co-founder.

Loose Cannon would go defunct without producing another game by 2010, with Dev Madan and Matthew Scott moving on to PopCap Games and Ricci Rukavina to found Kung Fu Factory.

Announcement 
The game's development was first publicly announced on June 3, 2009, under the title Zephyr: Rise of the Elementals. On July 9, 2009, the game received a new title, Tornado Outbreak.

Reception 

The game got moderate to good reviews. GameSpot gave it 6.5 out of 10, Game Informer game it 6.75 out of 10, and IGN gave it 8.1 out of 10.

References 

2009 video games
PlayStation 3 games
Video games scored by Peter McConnell
Video games developed in the United States
Wii games
Xbox 360 games
Split-screen multiplayer games
Video games set in the United States
Video games set in the United Kingdom
Video games set in Japan
Video games set in Tokyo
Video games with alternate endings